Saskia Clark,  (born 23 August 1979 in Colchester, Essex) is a British sailor and Olympic Gold medalist. She competed in the 2008 Summer Olympics and she was selected, along with Hannah Mills, to sail in the 470 Women's class for Team GB. They went on to win silver at the 2012 Olympic games and a gold medal at the 2016 games.

Life
Saskia started sailing at Dabchicks Sailing Club in an Optimist when she was 8 years old

She came 6th in the 2008 Summer Olympics sailing in the 470 Class with Christina Bassadone. She was set to sail with Sarah Ayton in the 2012 Summer Olympics, but Sarah retired to focus on her family life. Saskia was then paired with Hannah Mills.

At the 2011 Skandia Sail For Gold Regatta and the 2011 Weymouth & Portland International Regatta, Saskia won a Silver medal in the 470 Women class.

After they suffered a black flag in the first race of the championships, Saskia and her helm Hannah claimed Gold at the 2012 470 World Championships in Barcelona.

Clark was appointed Member of the Order of the British Empire (MBE) in the 2017 New Year Honours for services to sailing.

References

External links
 
 470 Girls Official Website
 RYA Profile

1979 births
Living people
Sportspeople from Colchester
Olympic sailors of Great Britain
English female sailors (sport)
Sailors at the 2008 Summer Olympics – 470
Sailors at the 2012 Summer Olympics – 470
Olympic silver medallists for Great Britain
Olympic medalists in sailing
Medalists at the 2012 Summer Olympics
420 class world champions
470 class world champions
Sailors at the 2016 Summer Olympics – 470
Medalists at the 2016 Summer Olympics
Olympic gold medallists for Great Britain
ISAF World Sailor of the Year (female)
Members of the Order of the British Empire
Yngling class world champions
World champions in sailing for Great Britain
People educated at Colchester County High School